William James Rees (1913–1967) was a British hydroid and cephalopod researcher at the Natural History Museum in London. He described a number of species, including Sepia dubia, Sepia sewelli, and Sepia thurstoni.

References

20th-century British zoologists
Teuthologists
1913 births
1967 deaths